William Francis Ross Hardie (25 April 1902 – 30 September 1990) was a Scottish classicist, philosopher and academic. He was President of Corpus Christi College, Oxford, from 1950 to 1969.

Early life and education 
Hardie was born on 25 April 1902 in Edinburgh, Scotland to William Hardie, classical scholar. He was educated at Edinburgh Academy, then an all-boys private school. He studied classics at Balliol College, Oxford, graduating with a double first Bachelor of Arts (BA) degree in 1924: he was awarded a number of undergraduate prizes in classics and philosophy.

Academic career 
Hardie spent 1925 as a fellow by examination at Magdalen College, Oxford. In 1926, he was elected a Fellow of Corpus Christi College, Oxford. He was the college's tutor in philosophy: a notable tutee of his was Paul Grice. He became President of Corpus Christi College in 1950, and during his tenure saw the college fellowship double and the student numbers increase. He retired in 1969 and was appointed an honorary fellow by his college.

Personal life 
Im 1938, Hardie married Isobel St Maur Macaulay. Together they had two sons.

Hardie died on 30 September 1990 in Oxford, England.

Works

References

External links 
 A Lucianic Dialogue, Between Socrates in Hades and Certain Men of the Present Day, Who Are Conducted Thither by Pollux on One of His Annual Excursions (1922) by William Francis Ross Hardie [at Internet Archive]

1902 births
1990 deaths
Fellows of Corpus Christi College, Oxford
Scottish classical scholars
20th-century British philosophers
Presidents of Corpus Christi College, Oxford
People educated at Edinburgh Academy
Alumni of Balliol College, Oxford
Fellows of Magdalen College, Oxford
Scottish philosophers